Dolores Turchi (Oliena, 1935) is an Italian writer.

Born in Oliena from a Tuscan family, Dolores Turchi was a primary school teacher. She wrote several publications about traditions and culture in Sardinia.

Since 1989 to 1991 she was director of the magazine Sardigna Antiga ("Old Sardinia" in English), since 1992 to 1995 of the magazine Sardegna Antica – culture mediterranee ("Old Sardinia - Mediterranean cultures" in English). Lately, she founded the magazine Sardegna Mediterranea ("Mediterranean Sardinia" in English). In 2003 she founded the publishing company Iris.

She has been organizer of congress about Sardinian linguistics, she taught in academic courses about Sardinian culture and traditions, and in 2004 she was rewarded for essay writing  during the Sardinian literature festival in Bono and in 2009 during the Amistade prize in Olbia.
In 2007 she was rewarded of the prize in journalism "Funtana Elighe" in Silanus.

Bibliography

References 

1935 births
Italian women writers
Living people
People from the Province of Nuoro
People of Tuscan descent
Sardinian women